Jazne is a settlement in the hills above the Idrijca Valley in the Municipality of Cerkno in the traditional Littoral region of Slovenia.

Church
The local church is dedicated to Saint Nicholas and belongs to the Parish of Otalež.

Cultural heritage

The remnants of a Roman defensive wall, the Claustra Alpium Iuliarum, lie in the southeastern part of Jazne. The wall is located south of the Lanišar farm, and it runs east of the hamlet of Znojile toward Gorenje Jazne.

References

External links 

Jazne on Geopedia

Populated places in the Municipality of Cerkno